Football Club Edaga Hamus is an Eritrean football club based in the Edaga Hamus in the district of Asmara. It plays in the Eritrean Premier League.

Current squad

References

Football clubs in Eritrea